Minor Counties North played in List A cricket matches between 1972 and 1979. This is a list of the players who appeared in those matches.

Steve Atkinson (1974): SR Atkinson
David Bailey (1973–1979): D Bailey
Terry Barnes (1974): TH Barnes
Douglas Beckett (1979): DK Beckett
Peter Bradley (1973–1975): P Bradley
Alan Brown (1974): A Brown
Alan Burridge (1972–1974): AJ Burridge
Richard Burton (1974): RL Burton
Bob Cooke (1972–1979): RMO Cooke
Mike Crawhall (1972): JM Crawhall
John Dale (1974): JR Dale
Richard Downend (1972–1975): RH Downend
Ian Gemmell (1979): IJ Gemmell
Peter Gibbs (1973): PJK Gibbs
Antony Good (1979): AJ Good
Stephen Greensword (1973): S Greensword
David Halfyard (1972–1973): DJ Halfyard
David Hancock (1972–1975): DA Hancock
Quorn Handley (1979): FLQ Handley
Gerry Hardstaff (1972): GC Hardstaff
John Harvey (1975): JF Harvey
Michael Hodson (1979): MD Hodson
Richard Jefferson (1972): RI Jefferson
Steve Johnson (1979): JS Johnson
Brian Lander (1973–1974): BR Lander
Martin Maslin (1972–1975): M Maslin
Colin McManus (1975): CA McManus
Richard Mercer (1979): RAD Mercer
Frederick Millett (1972–1973): FW Millett
Steve Milner (1975): SA Milner
Ian Moore (1973–1974): HI Moore
John Moore (1975): JD Moore
Tracey Moore (1972–1973): TI Moore
Neil O'Brien (1979): NT O'Brien
Alan Old (1973–1975): AGB Old
Roger Pearman (1974–1975): R Pearman
Thomas Pearsall (1979): TA Pearsall
Kenneth Pearson (1979): K Pearson
Brian Perry (1975): BJ Perry
David Pilch (1974–1975): DG Pilch
Geoffrey Plaskitt (1972): G Plaskitt
Neil Riddell (1979): NA Riddell
Geoff Robinson (1972–1979): G Robinson
Keith Rudd (1973): RK Rudd
Tony Shippey (1972): PA Shippey
Doug Slade (1974): DNF Slade
Keith Stride (1975): KH Stride
Arthur Sutton (1975): JA Sutton
Peter Swart (1975): PD Swart
Stuart Wilkinson (1979): JS Wilkinson
Derek Wing (1972–1975): DC Wing
Ian Wishart (1979): IA Wishart
Stuart Wood (1975): SL Wood
John Woodford (1975): JD Woodford

References

List
Minor Counties of English and Welsh cricket